Dancing in the Dark is a 1986 Canadian drama film directed and written by Leon Marr, based on the 1982 novel Dancing in the Dark by Joan Barfoot. It was produced by Anthony Kramreither, Don Haig and co-produced by John Ryan. The film is about a housewife, Edna (Martha Henry), whose life revolves around her husband Henry (Neil Munro). Edna spends her days cleaning the house making sure that it looks spotless and fulfilling her husband's every need in the process. After Henry betrays Edna's trust she murders him and then finds herself in a psychiatric hospital where she relives her old life by writing in her journal.

Dancing in the Dark is considered a feminist film. The story shows the legal system wavering in favour of Edna as she is placed in a psychiatric hospital instead of a prison after her crime.

Dancing in the Dark premiered at the Cannes Film Festival in May 1986. It was then shown in September 1986 as part of the Perspectives Canada programme of the Toronto Festival of Festivals, now known as the Toronto International Film Festival. It was shown later that month at the New York Film Festival.

Plot
The story begins as the present unfolds along with scenes from the past about Edna, a woman in a hospital who each day writes down her memories. She is a devoted housewife, an excellent cook, and in love with her husband Harry who often compliments her on her cooking, fills their conversations with his life at work, and they seem quite normal if perhaps a little boring. Edna's attitude towards herself suddenly changes resulting in her ending her 20-year marriage by stabbing Harry with a kitchen knife. Edna cannot (or will not) talk to her doctor, and nurses have to take care of her basic needs. Edna's hospital surroundings give way to the bright colours of her home life as her memories of her past life surface as she writes.

Cast

Release
Dancing in the Dark was first shown at the Cannes Film Festival in May 1986 in Cannes, France. It was premiered in the most prestigious category within the festival.

The film was shown at the 1986 Festival of Festivals in Toronto on September 5, 1986. Martha Henry received a Special Jury Citation from the Best Canadian Film jury.

Dancing in the Dark was shown at Alice Tully Hall in New York City at the New York Film Festival on September 25 and September 27, 1986.

Reaction
Before Dancing in the Dark, Anthony Kramreither was not considered to be a prestigious producer and many critics would avoid going to see his work. After the release of Dancing in the Dark at the Cannes Film Festival in August 1986 critics sought out his work and were writing generous reviews about his films.

The film got mixed reviews. In Canada reviews were generally positive, and the film helped jumpstart Leon Marr's directorial career. The French newspaper L'Humanité, which at the time was a communist newspaper, wrote that the film was "fabulous" and "highly original".

The American and the English generally did not appreciate the film. English film critic Derek Malcolm said that the film was "Terrible, embarrassingly sincere, and also embarrassingly inept". American film critic Dave Kehr said the film was "like a second-rate film of the seventies".

Awards
 1986 Toronto International Film Festival Best Canadian Feature Film - Special Jury Citation, 1986
 International Filmfestival Mannheim-Heidelberg, Mannheim - Special Mention, Interfilm Jury, 1986
 International Filmfestival Mannheim-Heidelberg, Mannheim - Special Mention, Catholic Film Jury, 1986
 8th Genie Awards, Toronto: Genie Award for Best Achievement in Art Direction/Production Design - Lillian Sarafinchan, 1987
 8th Genie Awards, Toronto: Genie Award for Best Performance by an Actress in a Leading Role - Martha Henry, 1987
 8th Genie Awards, Toronto: Genie Award for Best Adapted Screenplay - Leon Marr, 1987
 8th Genie Awards, Toronto: Nominee: Leon Marr, Direction, 1987 
 8th Genie Awards, Toronto: Nominee: Best Motion Picture, 1987
 Valladolid International Film Festival, Valladolid: Nominee, Best Film 1986

References

External links
 
 

1986 films
1986 drama films
Films based on Canadian novels
English-language Canadian films
Canadian drama films
1980s feminist films
1980s English-language films
1980s Canadian films